Kummelin Jackpot is a 2006 Finnish comedy film directed by Pekka Karjalainen. It features the Kummeli group of comedians.

Cast 
 Heikki Silvennoinen - Pertti 'Pera' Järvelä
 Timo Kahilainen - Pasi 'Japa' Jaatinen
 Heikki Vihinen - Anssi 'Spude' Suutarinen
 Heikki Hela - Seppo Sillantaus
  - Maija Karvinen
 André Wickström - Antti Ruotsalainen
 Mari Turunen - Pirkko Sillantaus / Raili
  - Leila 
  - Annina Järvelä
 Ritva Roine - Paula
 Taneli Mäkelä - Eikka
 Risto Salmi - Rauno Järvelä
 Taina Elg - Mrs. Skogstedt
 Aake Kalliala - Keijo Mattila

References

External links 

2006 comedy films
2006 films
Finnish comedy films